Caloreas cydrota is a moth in the family Choreutidae. It was described by Edward Meyrick in 1915. It is found in Colombia. According to a study in the Brazilian Journal of Biology, the species has also been noted to be naturally occurring in Brazil.

References

Choreutidae
Moths described in 1915